A PoC radio (short for push to talk over cellular radio), also known as PTToC radio, is an instant communication device that is based on the cellular network. It is a radio device that incorporates push-to-talk technology into a cellular radio handset. It allows users to communicate with one or more receivers instantly,  in a half-duplex mode. 

Although a PoC radio is a walkie-talkie-like device,  there are substantial differences between them. Compared to the latter, the former has a wider range of channels, covers a wider area, and does not require a license to transmit. In addition, a PoC radio supports advanced functions, such as, video calls, multimedia messages, GPS location tracking, and emergency notifications. 

PoC radios are widely used in the industries of private security, logistics, hospitality, and rescue. The representative manufacturers of such equipments include Hytera and ToooAir.

History
The concept of PoC was introduced by U.S. telecommunications company Nextel in 1987. The first commercial use of PoC radios was also started by the company in 2002.

In June 2005, the Open Mobile Alliance rolled out an approved standard called "PoC 1.0". In April 2020, Hytera presented a PoC radio named PNC550, equipped with a 5-inch touchscreen that supports full operation using gloves.

References

American inventions
Radio communications
Mobile telecommunications user equipment